Time and Tide Bell is an art project made up of bells, designed by UK sculptor Marcus Vergette and Australian bell designer Neil McLachlan, installed at coastal locations in the UK.  The first one was placed at Appledore, Devon, in 2009 and the seventh at Mablethorpe, Lincolnshire in June 2019.  at least six further bells are planned, and funding obtained from the National Lottery Heritage Fund in 2018 will allow for up to sixteen bells in all to be installed.

Each bell rings around high tide; the bells provide a reminder that rising sea levels caused by climate change will make the pattern of their ringing change. There is every chance that some of the bells will have to be relocated in the twenty-first century.

Location of the bells

References

External links

Public art in the United Kingdom
Bells (percussion)
Outdoor sculptures in England
Outdoor sculptures in Scotland
Outdoor sculptures in Wales